The South Australian Tourism Commission (SATC), also known as the SA Tourism Commission, is  an organisation set up by the Government of South Australia to promote tourism in South Australia.

The legislation to establish the SATC was introduced by the Hon Mike Rann, Minister for Tourism. The South Australian Tourism Commission Act 1993 was gazetted on 27 May 1993 with the agency commencing operation of 1 July 1993.

SATC Divisions
 Corporate Services
 Events South Australia
 Executive Services
 Trade and International Marketing
 International Marketing
 National Trade Marketing
 Trade Events and Projects
 South Australian Visitor & Travel Centre
 Marketing Division
 Marketing Communications
 Regional Marketing
 E-Marketing and Communications
 National Tourism Accreditation Program
 Human Resources
 Tourism Development Group
 Tourism Infrastructure
 Tourism Policy & Planning Group

Prior state government tourism agencies
In 1908, the state government created an agency called the State Tourist Bureau which underwent the following name changes:
In July 1910, renamed as the Intelligence and Tourist Bureau.
In 1924, renamed as the Immigration, Intelligence and Tourist Bureau. 
In 1928, renamed as the Government Publicity and Tourist Bureau. 
In 1958, renamed as the Immigration, Publicity and Tourist Bureau.
In 1972, renamed as the South Australian Government Tourist Bureau. 
In 1981, renamed as the South Australian Government Travel Centre.

See also
 Tourism in Australia

References

External links
Official website

Tourism
Tourism in South Australia
Tourism organisations in Australia